Tony Fan-Cheong Chan is a Chinese American mathematician who has been serving as President of the King Abdullah University of Science and Technology (KAUST) since 2018. Prior that, he was President of the Hong Kong University of Science and Technology from 2009 to 2018.

In June 2017, Chan announced his early resignation in September 2018 from HKUST. In January 2018, HKUST announced Wei Shyy appointed acting president to succeed Chan, who took over the remaining half year of Chan's tenure as he left the university earlier for foreign exchanges aimed at helping prepare for HKUST's future construction of an innovation building. On 31 August 2018, Chan formally left his position as president following ten years of tenure.

Early life
Born in Hong Kong, Chan completed his secondary education at Salesian English School and Queen's College in Hong Kong. Chan received his B.S. in Engineering and M.S. in Aeronautics (both with Honors) from the California Institute of Technology and his Ph.D. in computer science from Stanford University in 1978.

Academic career
Before joining Hong Kong University of Science and Technology, he was the assistant director of the Mathematical and Physical Sciences Directorate at the US National Science Foundation from 2006 to 2009. He pursued postdoctoral research at Caltech as research fellow, and taught computer science at Yale University before joining UCLA as Professor of Mathematics in 1986.

He was appointed chair of the Department of Mathematics in 1997 and served as dean of physical sciences from 2001 to 2006. He was one of the principal investigators who made the successful proposal to the NSF to form the Institute for Pure and Applied Mathematics, an NSF-funded institute at UCLA. He served as its director from 2000 to 2001.

He has been listed as an ISI Highly Cited Author in Mathematics by the ISI Web of Knowledge, Thomson Scientific Company. He also sits on the selection committee for the Mathematics award, given under the auspices of the Shaw Prize.

He is an elected member of the US National Academy of Engineering, an IEEE Fellow, a Fellow of the Society for Industrial and Applied Mathematics and the American Association for the Advancement of Science. He has served on the editorial boards of many journals in mathematics and computing, including SIAM Review, SIAM Journal of Scientific Computing, the Asian Journal of Mathematics, and is one of the three Editors-in-Chief of Numerische Mathematik. He co-wrote the proposal to start a new SIAM Journal of Imaging Sciences and serves on its inaugural editorial board till 2012.

External appointments
He is currently a member of the board of trustees of the King Abdullah University of Science and Technology in Saudi Arabia, President's Advisory Council of the Korea Advanced Institute of Science and Technology, Scientific Advisory Board of the University of Vienna, International Advisory Board of Academic Ranking of World Universities at Shanghai Jiao Tong University, board of trustees of Skolkovo Institute of Science and Technology in Russia, RIKEN Advisory Council of Japan, and the United States Committee of 100.

He is also a founding member of The Academy of Sciences of Hong Kong, the president of the Hong Kong Institution of Science, and a Fellow of the Hong Kong Academy of Engineering Sciences and a member of the advisory committee on Innovation and Technology of the Hong Kong Government.

He was a member of the selection committee for the Shaw Prize in Mathematical Sciences in 2012 and 2013. He is the chair of Nevanlinna Prize Committee for the International Congress of Mathematicians 2018 (ICM 2018) (Rio de Janeiro, Brazil).

Honors and awards
 Member of the National Academy of Engineering, 2014, "for numerical techniques applied to image processing and scientific computing, and for providing engineering leadership at the national and international levels."
 IEEE Fellow, 2016, "for contributions to computational models and algorithms for image processing".
 Honorary Doctorate, University of Strathclyde, UK, 2015.
 Honorary Doctorate, University of Waterloo, Canada, 2022.

Footnotes

References

External links
Official website of HKUST

 

1952 births
Living people
University of California, Los Angeles faculty
Presidents of the Hong Kong University of Science and Technology
20th-century Hong Kong mathematicians
20th-century American mathematicians
21st-century American mathematicians
Members of Committee of 100
Fellows of the Society for Industrial and Applied Mathematics
Alumni of Queen's College, Hong Kong
Members of the United States National Academy of Engineering
Fellow Members of the IEEE
American people of Chinese descent
Hong Kong emigrants to the United States
American expatriates in Saudi Arabia
Academic staff of King Abdullah University of Science and Technology